was a Japanese photojournalist who survived the dropping of the atomic bomb on the city of Hiroshima on 6 August 1945 and took five photographs on the day of the bombing in Hiroshima, the only photographs taken that day within Hiroshima that are known.

Matsushige was born in Kure, Hiroshima in 1913. He took a job at a newspaper after finishing school and in 1943 entered the photography section of the newspaper Chugoku Shimbun.

Matsushige was at home 2.7 km south of the hypocentre at the time of the explosion. He was not seriously injured, and determined to go to the city centre. A fire forced him back to Miyuki bridge, where the scene of desperate and dying people prevented him from using his camera for twenty minutes, when he took two frames at about 11:00. He tried again later that day but was too nauseated to take more than three more frames. The first two frames are of people who escaped serious injury next to Miyuki bridge; the second of these is taken closer up and shows them having cooking oil applied to their burns. A third shows a policeman, his head bandaged, issuing certificates to civilians. The last pair are taken close to home: one of the damage to his family's barbershop, and another out of his window.

Matsushige was unable to develop the film for twenty days, and even then had to do so at night and in the open, rinsing it in a stream. The negatives had severely deteriorated by the 1970s, requiring intensive restoration work.

Selected photos

References

Further reading

Iwakura Tsutomu. "The Need for a Photographic and Motion Picture Museum for Peace". Kaku: Hangenki, pp. 12–14.
Kaku: Hangenki (核：半減期) / The Half Life of Awareness: Photographs of Hiroshima and Nagasaki. Tokyo: Tokyo Metropolitan Museum of Photography, 1995.  Exhibition catalogue; captions and text in both Japanese and English. Three photographs by Matsushige are reproduced (other works are by Ken Domon, Toshio Fukada, Kikujirō Fukushima, Shigeo Hayashi, Kenji Ishiguro, Shunkichi Kikuchi, Mitsugi Kishida, Eiichi Matsumoto, Shōmei Tōmatsu, Hiromi Tsuchida and Yōsuke Yamahata).
Kaneko Ryuichi. "The Half-Life of Awareness: Photographs of Hiroshima and Nagasaki". Kaku: Hangenki, pp. 21–24.

External links
 Testimony of Yoshito Matsushige
 Photographs taken by Yoshito Matsushige in Hiroshima
 Yoshito Matsushige obituary (Japan Times, 18 Jan2005)

Japanese photojournalists
1913 births
2005 deaths
Hibakusha
People from Kure, Hiroshima
20th-century photographers
20th-century Japanese artists